Mikroorganizmi (Russian: Микроорганьизмия) is a studio album released in 1996 by Montenegrin-Serbian musician Rambo Amadeus (credited on the cover as Ranko Amadeus) and Goran Vejvoda. It features inaccessible, moody sound garnered with terse, experimental lyrics marking a sizable departure from Rambo Amadeus' usual antics. Stylistically, Mikroorganizmi is a unique album in Rambo Amadeus' discography and thus can be marked as much more ambient-oriented LP.

Track listing
All songs by Rambo Amadeus and Goran Vejvoda

 "Mikroorganizmi" (5:17) (voice: Sergej Afrika)
 "Alo Požega" (3:38)
 "Smrt No. 2" (4:29)
 "Evribadi dens (nau)" (4:27)
 "Mango Chutney Jungle" (4:53)
 "Ray Ban protiv Linguafona" (4:24) (guest performers: Bata Meger and Ninoslav Ademović)
 "Linguafon protiv Johna Kwesija" (4:33)
 "Oklopno Rave Kolo Gucha 2001 GTLX" (4:38)
 (Hidden track) (5:32) (vocals: Rambo Amadeus)

Personnel
Rambo Amadeus  
 Goran Vejvoda
 Dragan Vukićević-Gogolj - engineer, mastering
 Slavimir Stojanović - artwork design
The following samples were used: vinyl "Sremski front" and soundtrack from film Užička republika in track 2, Toma Milanković's archive in track 3, 7 & 8, Antonije Pušić's archive in track 4, some domestic & foreign vinyls in track 5 & 6.

Notes

External links
Mikroorganizmi at Discogs
Mikroorganizmi on Rambo Amadeus' official web site

1997 albums
Rambo Amadeus albums